Bruce Piemarini (born 1953, Leominster, Massachusetts, United States) is an American painter.  He was a member of the New New Painters a group of artists first brought together by the first curator of modern and contemporary art at the Boston Museum of Fine Arts, Dr. Kenworth Moffett (1934 - 2016) in 1978 contemporaneously with the further development of acrylic gel paint as developed by the paint chemist Sam Golden.

References

External links
Official website

1953 births
Living people
20th-century American painters
American male painters
21st-century American painters
21st-century American male artists
20th-century American male artists